In Sethian Gnostic texts, Yesseus Mazareus Yessedekeus is the personification of the Living Water. He is mentioned in the Nag Hammadi tractates of the Holy Book of the Great Invisible Spirit, Zostrianos, and Apocalypse of Adam.

Etymology
The etymology of the name is as follows.

Yesseus from Jesus
Mazareus from Nazarene (Greek: nazōraios)
Yessedekeus from "the righteous" (Greek: ho dikaios)

Parallels in Mandaeism
In Mandaeism, the uthra (celestial spirit) Piriawis Ziwa is the personification of the heavenly river of living water. Qolasta prayers 13 and 17 mention Piriawis Ziwa and Piriafil Malaka together as uthras.

In Mandaean scriptures such as the Ginza Rabba,  (pronounced ) is mentioned as the personification of the Euphrates, which is considered to be the earthly manifestation of the heavenly yardna or flowing river (similar to the Yazidi concept of Lalish being the earthly manifestation of its heavenly counterpart).

See also
Five Seals
Micheus, Michar, and Mnesinous
Piriawis
Jesus in Manichaeism
Mandaean priests, who are referred to as Nasoraeans (Nazerenes)
Water of Life (Christianity)
Living Water

References

Sethianism
Water and religion
Religious perspectives on Jesus
Names of God in Gnosticism
Names of Jesus
Gnostic deities
Nazareth
Water deities